Jeff Whitefoot may refer to:
 Jeff Whitefoot (rugby union) (born 1956), Welsh former international rugby union player
 Jeff Whitefoot (footballer) (born 1933), English former footballer